Merrill Avenue Historic District may refer to:

Merrill Avenue Historic District (Glendive, Montana), listed on the National Register of Historic Places (NRHP) in Dawson County
Merrill Avenue Historic District (Beloit, Wisconsin), listed on the NRHP in Rock County